Eilema lamprocraspis is a moth of the subfamily Arctiinae. It was described by George Hampson in 1914. It is found in the Seychelles.

References

lamprocraspis
Moths described in 1914
Fauna of Seychelles